Marnie Reece-Wilmore (born 10 January 1974) is an Australian actress from Sydney. She is best known for her role playing Debbie Martin in Neighbours, and was the third actress to portray the character.

Career
Reece-Wilmore is best known for playing Debbie Martin in the Australian soap opera Neighbours from 1992 to 1994, and again from 1996 to 1997. In 2005, Reece-Wilmore filmed a cameo for the Neighbours''' 20th anniversary special.

Since leaving Neighbours in 1997, Reece-Wilmore has made guest appearances in television programmes such as Police Rescue, Blue Heelers, Stingers, Law of the Land, Halifax f.p.,  City Homicide,  Dogstar and The New Adventures of Ocean Girl.

She also appeared as an LA Groupie in the 2002 film Queen of the Damned, and has worked with both the Melbourne and Sydney Theatre Companies in a play of Pride and Prejudice''.

Reece-Wilmore is currently working as a voice-over actor in Melbourne, where she lends her voice to radio and television commercials.

References

External links

1974 births
Living people
Australian television actresses